(Behold and see, if there be any sorrow), 46 , is a church cantata by Johann Sebastian Bach. He composed it for the tenth Sunday after Trinity and it was first performed on 1 August 1723 in Leipzig.

The cantata is part of Bach's first cantata cycle, which he began when he took up office as Thomaskantor in May 1723. The topic is based on the prescribed reading from the gospel of Luke, Jesus announcing the destruction of Jerusalem and cleansing of the Temple. The librettist is unknown. The cantata is structured in six movements: two choral movements frame a sequence of alternating recitatives and arias. The opening movement is based on a verse from the Book of Lamentations, a lament of the destructed Jerusalem, related to the announcement from the gospel. The text moves from reflecting God's wrath in the past to the situation of the contemporary Christian. The closing chorale, a stanza from Johann Matthäus Meyfart's hymn "", is a prayer culminating in the thought "do not repay us according to our sins".

The cantata is scored for three vocal soloists (alto, tenor and bass), a four-part choir, and a Baroque instrumental ensemble of a corno da tirarsi (possibly a slide trumpet),  two recorders, two oboes da caccia, strings and basso continuo. This is an unusually rich instrumentation for an ordinary Sunday. Bach created in the opening chorus an unusual "uncompromising" fugue for up to nine parts. The bass aria with an obbligato trumpet, depicting God's wrath compared to a thunderstorm, has been regarded as "more frightening" than any contemporary operatic 'rage' arias. The closing chorale is not the usual simple four-part setting, but includes instrumental interludes reminiscent of motifs used before.

He made considerable changes when he adapted the lamenting music to depict the Lamb of God carrying the sins of the world.

History and words 

The prescribed readings for the Sunday were from the First Epistle to the Corinthians, different gifts, but one spirit, and from the gospel of Luke, Jesus announcing the destruction of Jerusalem and cleansing of the Temple.

As with other cantatas Bach composed in his first years in Leipzig, we do not know the identity of the librettist. It is the third in a group of ten cantatas following the same structure of biblical text (in this case from the Old Testament) – recitative – aria – recitative – aria – chorale. The ten cantatas were dedicated to the 8th to 14th and 21st to 22nd Sunday after Trinity and the second Sunday after Easter.

The words for the first movement are taken from the Book of Lamentations, a lament about the historic destruction of Jerusalem. The text, suitable in connection with the announcement by Jesus, is among the prescribed readings for Good Friday and has been set to music often. The text for the inner movements 2 to 5 were written by the unknown poet, who dedicated a pair of recitative and aria to the memory of the historic event, another pair to the warning that the contemporary Christian is threatened in a similar way. The final chorale is the ninth stanza of "" by Johann Matthäus Meyfart.

Bach led the Thomanerchor and instrumentalists in the first performance on 1 August 1723.

Music

Structure and scoring 

The cantata is structured in six movements and scored for three vocal soloists (alto (A), tenor (T) and bass (B)), a four-part choir (SATB), and a Baroque instrumental ensemble of a slide trumpet (Tr), mostly doubling the choir soprano, two recorders (Fl), two oboes da caccia (Oc), two violins (Vl), viola (Va) and basso continuo (Bc). This is an unusually rich instrumentation for an ordinary Sunday. The duration is given as 20 minutes.  The title on the original parts reads: "10 post Trinit: / Schauet doch und sehet, ob irgend ein etc. / a / 4 Voci / 1 Tromba /
2 Flauti / 2 Hautb: da Caccia / 2 Violini / Viola / con / Continuo / di Sign: / J.S.Bach".

In the following table of the movements, the scoring and keys and time signatures are taken from Alfred Dürr, using the symbol for common time (4/4). The instruments are shown separately for winds and strings. The regular continuo is not shown, playing in most movements but not in movement 5.

Movements

1 

The first movement, "" (Behold and see, if there be any sorrow), in two sections is a lamento of large proportions. The text of lament, part of the prescribed responsorios for Good Friday, has been set by many composers, including Tomás Luis de Victoria, Carlo Gesualdo and Handel who set it as a tenor arioso Messiah, the last movement before the scene of the death.

The movement is structured like a prelude and fugue, the prelude covering the beginning of the biblical verse, the fugue the anguish of the Lord's wrath. The "prelude" begins with 16 measures of instrumental music, with the strings "engaged in a persistent sobbing commentary", as John Eliot Gardiner puts it, who conducted the Bach Cantata Pilgrimage in 2000 and performed this cantata in the Brunswick Cathedral. In the second round of vocal entries, each part is intensified by a wind instrument. The musicologist Julian Mincham notes about Bach's different ways to convey the distress of the text: "There is frequent stressing of the word "Schmerz" (sorrow). Suspensions and dissonant seventh chords in the harmony add to the tension as do the uses of the highly expressive Neapolitan chord and false relations". The fugue, marked "Un poco allegro", covers the second part of the verse, translating to "For the Lord has made me full of anguish on the day of his wrathful anger." The fugue builds from two vocal parts and continuo to nine parts. Gardiner writes: "It is uncompromising in its contrapuntal wildness and grim, dissonant harmony."

In 1733 a period of mourning the death of August the Strong permitted the composition of complex music. The lamenting music depicts the Lamb of God carrying the sins of the world. Bach transposed the music from D minor to B minor, used transverse flutes instead of the recorders, dropped the instrumental opening and installed a repetitive bass, when he adapted the music to the new function. Towards the end of his life, Bach used the complete  for his Mass in B minor.

2 
A tenor recitative, "" (Lament then, O destroyed city of God), is accompanied by the recorders and the strings. The recorders play "five-note mourning figures" which may depict the tears of Jesus mourning the fall of Jerusalem. Mincham notes that "Bach′s experiments with instrumentation in a way that lends colour and expressive depth", adding that "it is equally likely that these iridescent twinkles are symbolic; flickering feelings of uncertainty within a demolished world".

3 
The first aria, sung by the bass, "" (Your storm arose from far off), depicts dramatically the outbreak of a thunderstorm. It is the only part of the cantata where the trumpet appears in a solo function, as a symbol of divine majesty. The strings and continuo depict the "rouring thunder and lightning striking the earth". Mincham notes about the double image: "The bass aria is, indeed, a graphic musical portrait of a thundering storm as well as an allegorical portrayal of God′s anger and fury". Gardiner regards the aria as "more frightening, than any operatic 'rage' aria of the time by, say, Vivaldi or Handel".

4 
The alto renders in a secco recitative: "'" (Yet do not imagine, o sinners). Mincham observes that "Bach is using the minimum of resource but even so, he still manages to create the maximum of effect", for example that in the last measures, in contrast to the calm beginning, "the harmony becomes more obscure, the bass less conjunct and the alto line more passionate".

5 
The alto aria, "" (Yet Jesus will, even in punishment), is scored as a quartet for the voice, the two recorders, and the oboes in unison, without basso continuo. Mincham notes that "the alto voice [is] surrounded and encompassed by instruments of contrasting but complementary timbres". A movement without continuo appeared in the same position within the cantata the previous week, a soprano aria about the "conscience of the sinner" in Herr, gehe nicht ins Gericht mit deinem Knecht, BWV 105. Here Jesus is seen as the caring good shepherd, whom the poet describes: "" (He gathers them as his sheep, Lovingly, as his little chicks).

6 

The closing chorale, "" (O great God of faithfulness), by Johann Matthäus Meyfart is a four-part setting, with the recorders playing "isolated little episodes between the lines of the chorales". They are reminiscent of the motifs of mourning heard in movement 2. The elaborate setting with instrumental interludes is similar as in Herr, gehe nicht ins Gericht mit deinem Knecht, BWV 105, composed a week earlier.

Recordings 

The listing is taken from the selection on the Bach Cantatas Website. Ensembles playing period instruments in historically informed performance are shown with green background.

References

Sources 
 
 Schauet doch und sehet, ob irgend ein Schmerz sei BWV 46; BC A 117 / Sacred cantata (10th Sunday after Trinity) Bach Digital
 BWV 46 Schauet doch und sehet, ob irgend ein Schmerz sei English translation, University of Vermont
 Luke Dahn: BWV 46.6 bach-chorales.com

Church cantatas by Johann Sebastian Bach
1723 compositions